Haddow is a surname, of Scottish origin. Notable people with the surname include:

 Alex Haddow (born 1982), English footballer
 Alexander John Haddow (1912–1978), Scottish entomologist
 David Haddow (1869–?), Scottish footballer
 Donald Haddow (born 1970), Canadian swimmer
 George Haddow (1833–1919), Canadian politician
 James Haddow (1872–1943), Scottish footballer
 Johnny Haddow, Scottish footballer and manager
 Ross Haddow (1896–1973), businessman and politician from Glasgow
 William Martin Haddow (1865–1945), Scottish socialist

Surnames of Scottish origin